The Misa is a river, 108 kilometres long, in the Semigallia region of Latvia. Its upper course till tributary Zvirgzde river is rectificated. There are active peat extraction sites and polders on the banks of the river from the village of Stelpe to Beibeži. From the Zvirgzde river to the village of Plakanciems there are several summer cottage colonies on the wooded banks of the Misa. From below Plakanciems to the Misa's confluence with the Iecava near Ozolnieki, the land either side of the river has a relatively high population density.

The biggest settlements near the river are: Stelpe, Beibeži, Dzērumi, Plakanciems, Pēternieki, Dalbe and Ozolnieki.

Tributaries

References

External links 

Rivers of Latvia

Tributaries of the Iecava (river)
Bauska Municipality
Jelgava Municipality
Semigallia